The Louville Niles House is a historic house in Somerville, Massachusetts.  The -story wood-frame house was built in 1890, and is one of the city's finest Queen Anne Victorian houses.  The house was designed by Edwin K. Blankie, an MIT graduate and local builder.  The building has irregular massing with numerous gable and roof lines.  Its most prominent feature is a round projecting corner bay which is topped by a conical roof with copper finial.

The house was listed on the National Register of Historic Places in 1989.

See also
National Register of Historic Places listings in Somerville, Massachusetts
Louville V. Niles House

References

Houses on the National Register of Historic Places in Somerville, Massachusetts
Houses completed in 1890